is a 2015 Japanese tokusatsu fantasy drama film directed by Sion Sono. It was released on June 27, 2015.

Plot
Ryo is a failed musician who now works in an office with Yuko, the woman of his dreams. He buys a pet turtle and names it Pikadon but is ridiculed for it at his office so he flushes it down the toilet, which he immediately regrets doing.

Pikadon finds a home among abandoned dolls in the sewer, where it is given a magical candy that allows it to grant Ryo's wish to become a successful musician. Ryo is inspired to write a song about missing Pikadon that becomes and unexpected hit when he performs it live with the band Revolution Q. The band's management replaces the name "Pikadon" with "Love & Peace" and plans out Ryo's career, starting with quitting his job.

Pikadon grows bigger as Ryo's wishes grow bigger, and it returns to Ryo to provide him with a new ballad. Ryo rebrands himself as a solo artist with his former bandmates as his backing band. Pikadon is captured and taken to a laboratory for experiments, but outgrows its bonds when Ryo holds a live concert at Nippon Stadium on December 25, eventually growing to the size of a kaiju and rampaging through the city until it reaches the stadium, where it confesses Ryo's love for Yuko.

Ryo runs out of the stadium and returns to his small apartment, where he finds that Pikadon has returned to its normal size. Outside, Yuko hesitantly approaches his apartment.

Cast
Hiroki Hasegawa
Kumiko Asō
Kiyohiko Shibukawa

Miyuki Matsuda
Toshiyuki Nishida

Reception

Commercial
The film earned  at the Japanese box office on its opening weekend.

Reviews
Peter Debruge of Variety wrote, "If you see just one new Sion Sono movie this year (and you potentially have as many as six to choose from, considering his current rate of output), make it “Love & Peace,” the wonderfully daffy passion project it reportedly took the appallingly prolific helmer more than two decades to make [ ... ] though “Love & Peace” is endearing in its own scrappily uneven way, he'd do well to slow things down in the future, lest he end up permanently labeled as the country's next Takashi Miike."

References

External links
 

2010s Japanese films
2010s fantasy drama films
2015 drama films
2015 films
Japanese Christmas films
Japanese fantasy drama films
Films directed by Sion Sono
Films about music and musicians
Films about musical groups
Films about singers
Films about turtles
Films set in Tokyo
Kaiju films
Tokusatsu films